There are at least 44 named lakes and reservoirs in Ouachita County, Arkansas.

Lakes
Bacon Lake, el.  
Ben Davis Lake, el.  
Big Dixon Lake, el.  
Blue Lake, el.  
Burks Pond, el.  
Fishers Lake, el.  
Georgia Lake, el.  
Grayson Pond, el.  
Hook Lake, el.  
Little Dixon Lake, el.  
Little Johnson Lake, el.  
Lower Old Brake, el.  
Lower Old River, el.  
Moon Lake, el.  
 Mustin Lake, el.  
 Pedron Lake, el.  
 Pine Lake, el.  
 Round Lake, el.  
 Tate Lake, el.  
 Toney Old River, el.  
 Treadway Slough, el.  
 Upper Old Brake, el.  
 Utley Lake, el.  
 Walker Lake, el.  
 Webb Lake, el.  
 Woodard Lake, el.

Reservoirs
Beavers Lake, el.  
Berg Lake, el.  
Bragg Lake, el.  
Brigham Lake, el.  
Davis Lake, el.  
Garner Lake Number One, el.  
Graysons Lake, el.  
Greenings Lake, el.  
Harvey Pond, el.  
Hassics Lake, el.  
Kennedy Pond, el.  
Lake Darby, el.  
Lake Landers, el.  
Lower White Oak Lake, el.  
Pace Lake, el.  
Saxon Lake, el.  
Senrac Lake, el.  
Upper White Oak Lake, el.

See also
 List of lakes in Arkansas

Notes

Bodies of water of Ouachita County, Arkansas
Ouachita